Plauen railway station may refer to:

 Plauen (Vogtland) Oberer Bahnhof, the Upper railway station in Plauen along Leipzig–Hof railway
 Plauen (Vogtland) Unterer Bahnhof, the Lower railway station in Plauen along Elster Valley Railway
 Dresden-Plauen railway station, a railway station in Dresden along Dresden–Werdau railway